Lugo is a comarca in the Galician Province of Lugo. It had a population of 118,931 as of 2019.

Municipalities
Castroverde, O Corgo, Friol, Guntín, Lugo, Outeiro de Rei, Portomarín and Rábade.

References 

Comarcas of the Province of Lugo